Li Dan  (born 06 May 1994) is a Chinese speed skater. She competed in the 2018 Winter Olympics.

References

External links
 

1994 births
Living people
Speed skaters at the 2018 Winter Olympics
Chinese female speed skaters
Olympic speed skaters of China
Speed skaters at the 2017 Asian Winter Games